Akeem Auguste (born October 3, 1989) is a former American football cornerback. He was signed by the Cleveland Browns as an undrafted free agent in 2013. He won a Super Bowl ring with the Seattle Seahawks against the Denver Broncos in Super Bowl XLVIII. He played college football at South Carolina.

Early years
Auguste attended Chaminade-Madonna High School. He was ranked as the 28th-best prospect in the state of Florida and as the 14th-best overall cornerback in the country by Rivals.com. He was selected to the first-team twice in high school.

Professional career

Cleveland Browns
On May 13, 2013, Auguste signed with the Cleveland Browns as an undrafted free agent. On August 31, 2013, he was released.

Seattle Seahawks
On November 27, 2013, Auguste signed with the Seattle Seahawks to join practice squad. He was released by the Seahawks on August 30, 2014.

References

External links
South Carolina Gamecocks bio
Cleveland Browns bio
Seattle Seahawks bio

1989 births
Living people
American football cornerbacks
Sportspeople from Hollywood, Florida
Players of American football from Florida
South Carolina Gamecocks football players
Cleveland Browns players
Seattle Seahawks players